Bom Jardim is a municipality/city in the state of Pernambuco in Brazil. The population in 2020 was 39,983 inhabitants and the total area is 218.43 km2.

Geography

 State - Pernambuco
 Region - Agreste of Pernambuco
 Boundaries - Orobó and Machados   (N);  João Alfredo   (S);  Vicência and Limoeiro   (E);   Surubim and Casinhas   (W).
 Area - 218.43 km2
 Elevation - 333 m
 Hydrography - Goiana River
 Vegetation - Subcaducifólia forest
 Climate  -  Tropical hot and humid
 Annual average temperature - 23.9 °C
 Distance to Recife - 115 km

Economy

The main economic activities in Bom Jardim are related with extractive industry, commerce and agribusiness, especially breeding of cattle, goats, sheep, pigs, chickens; and plantations of bananas and pineapples.

Economic Indicators

Economy by Sector
2006

Health Indicators

References

Municipalities in Pernambuco